Jalen Evander Lecque (born June 13, 2000) is an American professional basketball player for the Rio Grande Valley Vipers of the NBA G League. A consensus four-star recruit and former NC State commit, Lecque chose to forgo college basketball and immediately entered the 2019 NBA draft.

Early life
Lecque was born in Manhattan, New York and lived in The Bronx until he was three years old. Both of his parents worked in Harlem, his father at a barbershop and his mother at a hospital. As a toddler, Lecque moved with his family to Teaneck, New Jersey, where he attended elementary and middle school.

High school career
Instead of attending his local school Teaneck High School, Lecque decided to enroll at Monsignor Scanlan High School in The Bronx because of its superior basketball program. In the 2016–17 season, he averaged about 11 points per game. In April 2017, Lecque saw breakout success with Southern Stampede at the Nike Elite Youth Basketball League (EYBL), helping him gain interest from many prominent NCAA Division I programs.

Entering the 2017–18 season, Lecque transferred to Christ School in Arden, North Carolina while reclassifying from the 2018 to 2019 class. He was drawn to the school for not only basketball, but also academics. Lecque averaged 20.1 points, 9.1 rebounds, and 9.3 assists per game, leading his team to the 3A North Carolina Independent School Athletic Association (NCISAA) state semifinals. He was named Asheville Citizen-Times All-Western North Carolina (WNC) Player of the Year and earned NCISAA All-State honors.

On July 30, 2018, Lecque announced that he would transfer to Brewster Academy in Wolfeboro, New Hampshire for his senior season.

On April 20, 2019, Lecque declared for the 2019 NBA draft. On May 29, 2019, he remained in the NBA draft past the withdrawal deadline, ensuring that he would not play at the college level.

On May 8, 2019, Lecque was named one of 77 total players participating in the NBA Draft Combine later in the month. He recorded a 43-inch maximum vertical leap, the highest at the combine, and left the combine early after receiving positive feedback from NBA teams.

Recruiting

Professional career

Phoenix Suns (2019–2020)
Lecque committed to play college basketball for the North Carolina State Wolfpack as a freshman for the 2019-2020 season, but instead, because of his eligibility and age decided to abstain from a collegiate career and rescind his commitment. Lecque was not drafted in the 2019 NBA draft on June 20. He was signed to a 4-year deal, 2 years guaranteed, by the Phoenix Suns on July 6. On October 28, Lecque was assigned to the Northern Arizona Suns for the start of the 2019–20 NBA G League season. Lecque was recalled to Phoenix on multiple assignments throughout the season. Lecque made his NBA debut on January 16, playing in only two minutes for the Suns' 121–98 win over the New York Knicks.

Indiana Pacers (2020–2021)
On November 16, 2020, Lecque was traded to the Oklahoma City Thunder alongside Ty Jerome, Ricky Rubio, Kelly Oubre Jr., and a 2022 first-round pick in exchange for Chris Paul and Abdel Nader.

On November 25, 2020, Lecque was traded to the Indiana Pacers in exchange for T. J. Leaf and a future second-round pick. On March 25, 2021, Lecque was waived by the Pacers.

Wisconsin Herd (2021–2022) 
On October 15, 2021, Lecque signed a training camp deal with the Milwaukee Bucks.  He joined the Wisconsin Herd as an affiliate player.

Lecque joined the Dallas Mavericks for the 2022 NBA Summer League.

Rio Grande Valley Vipers (2022–present)
On November 3, 2022, Lecque was named to the opening night roster for the Rio Grande Valley Vipers.

Career statistics

NBA

Regular season

|-
| style="text-align:left;"|
| style="text-align:left;"|Phoenix
| 5 || 0 || 6.2 || .400 || .000 || 1.000 || .4 || .4 || .0 || .0 || 2.0
|-
| style="text-align:left;"|
| style="text-align:left;"|Indiana
| 4 || 0 || 3.0 || .111 || .000 || 1.000 || 1.3 || .5 || .0 || .0 || 1.3
|- class="sortbottom"
| style="text-align:center;" colspan="2"|Career
| 9 || 0 || 4.9 || .400 || .000 || 1.000 || .8 || .4 || .0 || .0 || 1.7

References

2000 births
Living people
American men's basketball players
Basketball players from New Jersey
Basketball players from New York City
Brewster Academy alumni
Fort Wayne Mad Ants players
Indiana Pacers players
Northern Arizona Suns players
People from Teaneck, New Jersey
Phoenix Suns players
Point guards
Rio Grande Valley Vipers players
Sportspeople from Bergen County, New Jersey
Sportspeople from Manhattan
Undrafted National Basketball Association players
Wisconsin Herd players